Prasinoxena monospila is a species of moth in the family Pyralidae first described by Edward Meyrick in 1894. It is found in Borneo.

It is the type species of the genus Prasinoxena.

References

External links
Original description: Meyrick, Edward (1894). "On Pyralidina from the Malay Archipelago". Transactions of the Entomological Society of London. 1894: 480.

Pyralidae
Moths described in 1894